The Garfield Building is a high-rise building on the corner of Euclid Avenue and E. 6th Street in Cleveland, Ohio, in the United States. It was the first steel frame skyscraper constructed in the city.

The original building
The edifice was designed by Henry Ives Cobb and built in 1893 by Harry Augustus Garfield and James Rudolph Garfield, sons of President James A. Garfield. The ten-story structure was the first steel frame office building erected in the city.

Patrons could access the upper floors via a large marble staircase or four elevators. All the upper floors featured Italian marble wainscoting.

A below-ground level was intended to serve as a bank, and several meeting rooms, banking parlors, and massive steel vaults were erected there during the building's construction at a cost of $100,000 ($ in  dollars). A customer for this space was not found until 1895, when the Cleveland Trust Company moved in. The building's major tenant was the local luxury jewelry firm of Cowell and Hubbard, which rented the entire first floor. In 1898, the Cleveland Trust Co. moved a portion of its operations onto the first floor, building "club rooms" for its male depositors to relax in while banking. and a "ladies' parlor" and tea room for its female patrons.

1921 renovations
In 1918, National City Corp. (a bank) purchased the Garfield Building. The structure was renovated at a cost of $500,000 ($ in  dollars), converting the entire first floor into a marble-walled public banking room. The architectural firm of Graham, Anderson, Probst & White oversaw the renovation. The structure was renamed the National City Bank Building after the renovation was complete in 1921. National City Corp. suffered extremely heavy financial losses on mortgages during the 2007-2009 Great Recession. Despite a $7 billion infusion of capital, the bank was sold at below-market-value in October 2008. Westcore Properties acquired the building in 2008.

21st century renovations
Having sat vacant since 2009, the Garfield Building was purchased by Millennia Companies in April 2014, with plans to convert it into apartments. The Garfield attracted renewed attention in April 2015 after portions of the parapet fell onto the sidewalk and adjacent parked cars. The newly renovated apartments opened as the Garfield Apartments in the fall of 2017.

In 2017, the former public banking hall in the Garfield Building was converted into an upscale restaurant, the Marble Room. Ground floor office space adjacent to the hall was converted into a kitchen, and a small mezzanine constructed to provide space for a glass-walled wine cellar. The below-ground bank vaults were converted into banquet and private dining space.

References
Notes

Citations

Bibliography

Residential skyscrapers in Cleveland
Buildings and structures completed in 1898